"Stand on It" is a song written and originally recorded by Bruce Springsteen.  Springsteen initially released it as the non-LP B-side of the "Glory Days" single in May 1985; the track was also featured in the film Ruthless People and its accompanying soundtrack album.  "Stand On It" later appeared in a slightly longer version with an extra verse on Springsteen's outtakes and B-sides compilation Tracks.

A little over a year after Springsteen's release, the song was recorded by American country music artist Mel McDaniel. It was released in September 1986 as the lead single from McDaniel's album, Just Can't Sit Down Music. It peaked at number 12 on the U.S. Billboard Hot Country Singles & Tracks chart and number 5 on the Canadian RPM Country Tracks chart.

Personnel (Springsteen version)
According to authors Philippe Margotin and Jean-Michel Guesdon:

Bruce Springsteen – vocals, guitars
Roy Bittan – piano
Garry Tallent – bass
Max Weinberg – drums

Chart performance
"Stand on It" debuted at number 70 on the U.S. Billboard Hot Country Singles & Tracks for the week of September 27, 1986.

References

1986 singles
Mel McDaniel songs
Songs written by Bruce Springsteen
Capitol Records Nashville singles
Song recordings produced by Jerry Kennedy
Bruce Springsteen songs